Sandra Eie (born 14 November 1995) is a Norwegian freestyle skier who represents Bærums SK and competes internationally.

She competed in the FIS Freestyle Ski and Snowboarding World Championships 2021, where she placed fifth in women's ski big air, and 8th in women's ski slopestyle.

References

External links
 
 
 
 

1995 births
Living people
Norwegian female freestyle skiers
Freestyle skiers at the 2022 Winter Olympics
Olympic freestyle skiers of Norway
21st-century Norwegian women